Discinida is an order of brachiopods comprising the extant superfamily Discinoidea, and the extinct superfamilies Botsfordioidea (early—mid-Cambrian) and Acrotheloidea (early Cambrian–Early Ordovician).  It represents a sister taxon to the Lingulids, and is possibly paraphyletic with respect to the Acrotretoids.—or the acrotretids are paraphyletic with respect to it.  The group displays a broad range of shell structures, some of which incorporate substantial organic or silicified components.

References

 
Brachiopod orders
Extant Cambrian first appearances